Compiègne station (French: Gare de Compiègne) is a railway station serving Compiègne, in the Oise department of northern France. The station is on the Creil–Jeumont railway. It is served by regional trains to Creil, Amiens, Saint-Quentin and Paris.

References

Railway stations in Oise
Railway stations in France opened in 1850